Granitas Kaunas  is a team handball club from Kaunas, Lithuania. Currently, Granitas Kaunas competes in the Lithuanian First League of Handball. Kaunas Granitas is the most successful team in Lithuania Handball history. It is the only team from Lithuania having won EHF Cup.

Accomplishments
EHF Cup: 1st
1987
1988 (finalist)
2002-2003 (Quarterfinal)
LHL: 1st (17)
Champion: 1991, 1992, 1993, 1994, 1995, 1996, 1997, 1998, 1999, 2000, 2001 2002, 2003, 2004, 2005, 2008, 2009
Runner-s up (2): 2012, 2022
Baltic Handball League: 1st (5)
1991, 1992, 1994, 1995, 1996
EHF Champions League: Group Stage (4)
1996-1997, 2004-2005, 2005-2006, 2008-2009
EHF Champions League: Round 16 (3)
1992-1993, 1994-1995,1995-1996

Famous players 

 Voldemaras Novickis
 Gintaras Savukynas
 Aidenas Malašinskas
 Rolandas Bernatonis

References

External links

Team page at eurohandball.com

Lithuanian handball clubs
Lithuanian Handball League clubs
Sport in Kaunas